Luis Alberto Orta Millan (born 15 January 1989) is a Venezuelan long distance runner who specializes in the marathon. He competed in the men's marathon event at the 2016 Summer Olympics. He currently holds two Venezuelan Records: one in the Half Marathon distance and in the 10 km (road).

Biography 
Luis Orta earned a master's degree from the University of Kentucky in Sports Management and Coaching in 2014. After this, he continued to pursue various certifications such as: RRCA Certified Coach in 2017, the Lydiard Certified Coach in 2018, the USATF Certified Coach in 2019 and the Vdot, Jack Daniels Certified Coach in 2020. He currently resides in Boulder, Colorado, where he founded My Olympic Coach LLC., an online training platform for athletes around the world. Orta is married to Sri Lankan-American track and field athlete Hiruni Wijayaratne.

While in college, Orta ran for the Kentucky Wildcats were he quickly became the Team captain and was awarded as Mr. Wildcat or athlete of the year for two years in a row.

Orta qualified for the Summer Olympics in 2016 held in Rio de Janeiro, Brazil, and was able to represent his birth country of Venezuela.  In his last chance to qualify, Orta was able to run the marathon Olympic standard at the 2016 Rotterdam Marathon in the Netherlands earlier that year, running only 6 seconds under the standard with a time of 2:18:56. At the Olympics that year, he ran the marathon in a time of 2:27:05 and finished 105th overall.

Competition record

References

External links
 

1989 births
Living people
Athletes (track and field) at the 2011 Pan American Games
Athletes (track and field) at the 2015 Pan American Games
Athletes (track and field) at the 2016 Summer Olympics
Olympic athletes of Venezuela
Pan American Games competitors for Venezuela
Venezuelan male long-distance runners
Venezuelan male marathon runners
World Athletics Championships athletes for Venezuela
Sportspeople from Caracas